Brazilian Romantic painting was the main expression of the plastic arts in Brazil in the second half of the 19th century. It had a palatial and restrained aspect, brought a strong neoclassical influence and soon blended with Realism, Symbolism and other schools, in an eclectic synthesis that prevailed until the early years of the 20th century.

In ideological terms, the painting of Brazilian Romanticism revolved mainly around the country's nationalist movement orchestrated by emperor Pedro II, aware of the problems arising from the lack of cultural unity in such a vast country and interested in presenting an image of a civilized and progressive Brazil to the world. This nationalism found its greatest expression in the visual reconstruction of important historical events, in the portrayal of nature and popular types, and in the rehabilitation of the indigenous figure, bequeathing a body of artwork that figures prominently in Brazilian museums to this day, and whose symbolism greatly contributed to the construction of a national identity.

International Romanticism 

Pictorial Romanticism, contrary to what is usually assumed, was a conglomeration of very different styles, often in opposition to each other, which flourished in Europe between the mid-18th and late 19th centuries. Critics have not reached a consensus on the definition of the Romantic style, or even on whether there was a Romantic "movement" as the term is generally conceived. Perhaps the only common trait these trends had was an appreciation for the individual, unique, and original vision of the artist, who had developed an acute, often dramatic, awareness of himself and the irrational aspects of his inner universe, and for the first time in the history of art thought himself free from having to be accountable to society and his patrons for the art he produced, basing his judgment not on rationalism or an aprioristic aesthetic program, but rather on his feelings, which were not indifferent to the transcendence of the self in a mystical communion with nature or the infinite. Baudelaire said:

Romanticism is found neither in the choice of themes nor in their objective truth, but in the way of feeling. For me, romanticism is the most recent and current expression of beauty. And whoever speaks of romanticism speaks of modern art, that is to say, intimacy, spirituality, color, and a tendency to the infinite, expressed by all the means available to the arts.

Often the expression of individual genius generated aesthetic projects that deliberately sought to shock, courting the bizarre, the unconventional, the exotic, and the eccentric, and bordering on the melodramatic, the morbid, and the hysterical. Many people of this generation suffered from what came to be known as the mal du siècle, a feeling of emptiness, of the uselessness of all efforts, of indefinable and incurable melancholy, of perpetual dissatisfaction. Géricault said that "whatever I do, I wish I had done differently.

On the other hand, the Romantics' fervent appreciation of nature often led to the conception of a pantheistic ideal of life and a new approach to landscaping, and their historicism revolutionized the view held of man within history and the value of traditional institutions such as the State and the Christian Church. A humanistic idealism that sought reform in society led many Romantics to make a sensitive portrayal of the people, their customs and folklore, and their history, which were the basis for the birth or strengthening of nationalist movements in several countries. However, after the turbulent period of the French Revolution and the Napoleonic Empire, the visionary, humanistic, turbulent, and contesting impetus of the early Romantics faded away. Subject matter lost importance relative to technique and form, and they mostly retreated to the utopian worlds of the East or the Middle Ages, or their force degenerated into a bourgeois sentimentality and conventionality, which seeked only the decorative, the exotic, and the picturesque. In technical terms, Romantic painting abandoned the predominance of drawing over color and the compositional rationalism of the neoclassical tradition in favor of more moving compositions with greater emotional appeal, where color and staining are elements of greater importance in the construction of the work, seeking to create more suggestive and sensitive atmospheric and light effects.

Thus, Romanticism is in fact a complex and contradictory movement, which is both born out of Classicism, being heavily influenced by it, and rejects it, and even fights with itself. Its emphasis on individualism naturally ended up generating an enormous multiplicity of aesthetic approaches and ideological bodies, and made its members feel typically rootless, stateless, and misunderstood. According to Hauser, "artistic goals had become too personal, the criterion of artistic quality too differentiated, to speak of schools.

The Brazilian version

Aesthetic and ideological background 

Although it emerged as a dominant current in painting only between 1850 and 1860, Romanticism in Brazil took root in the first decades of the 19th century, with the appearance of several foreign naturalists who came in search of lands yet to be explored. Besides the purely scientific motivation of these expeditions, among them were several painters and illustrators driven by the Romantic trend of valuing nature and the fascination with the exotic. In his watercolors, later reproduced as prints, Rugendas tended to portray the indigenous and the black man in an idealized, almost heroic way, but he was not blind to their sufferings. Nor did he ignore the majesty of the Brazilian landscape, refusing to meet his contractor's demands for scientific accuracy and assuming an independent creative attitude that was essential to the Romantics of the old world.

Aimé-Adrien Taunay, also a participant in the Langsdorff Expedition, was the son of Nicolas-Antoine Taunay, of the French Artistic Mission. His work was notable for the monumental treatment he gave to nature, still barely touched by the colonizers, approaching the aesthetics of the sublime, one of the most powerful sources of European Romanticism. He associated descriptive elements with evocative ones, creating interrelations between landscape and historical painting. Another precursor was the recommendation made in 1826 by the French consular attaché Ferdinand Denis to replace classicist tendencies in favor of local characteristics, making an apology for nature and the representation of native customs, in which the amerindian should be valued as the first and most authentic inhabitant of Brazil.

Jean-Baptiste Debret should also be remembered as an artist whose work, which from a strict neoclassical origin, arriving in Brazil became enlangued, adapting to the climate and informality of the tropical environment. Debret was impressed by what the slaves called the "banzo", or melancholy of the slaves, and portrayed it in several watercolors, of which Negra tatuada vendendo cajus is famous. The whole of his work in watercolor, gathered in his Picturesque and Historical Travel to Brazil, published in France, is a human and artistic document of the Brazilian life of his time, where Neoclassicism practically disappeared, replaced by an empathetic and naturalistic description of the slaves that had a typically romantic humanistic background.

These artists contributed to a certain "rediscovery" of Brazil, both for Europeans and Brazilians themselves, since the 300 years of colonization had not made their reality especially visible. Moreover, the beginning of urbanization, with its diffuse limits, favored the capture of city life in the integrating spirit of traditional European romantic landscaping. The peculiarity of the Brazilian process, according to Vera Siqueira, is that...

Besides the contribution of traveling painters, and of some precursor poets such as Maciel Monteiro, a group of intellectuals active from the 1830s on, right after Independence of Brazil, was more directly essential to start the Brazilian romantic movement, that would have in Pedro II a great patron, fomenting a series of debates about the political, economic, cultural and social direction that they believed the new nation should follow, laying the foundations for the viewpoint of interpretation of Brazil that would be adopted in the following decades by official circles and presenting "a mythical configuration of Brazilian reality based on the possibilities revealed by political autonomy. This mythical configuration, anchored in the exaltation of Brazil's nature and natural people, would be reproduced throughout the period from 1840 to 1860, a time of consolidation of the Brazilian monarchical state".

Their main menas of dissemination were some magazines of great circulation at the time, such as Revista Nitheroy, the Jornal de Debates Políticos e Literários, and the Revista do Instituto Histórico e Geográfico do Brasil, and among its most active debaters were Gonçalves de Magalhães, Francisco de Sales Torres Homem and Manuel de Araújo Porto-Alegre.

The social, economic and cultural conjuncture 

In the economic and social sphere, before Brazil's independence, most of the natural wealth, from brazilwood, gold and diamonds, had been extracted and shipped to Portugal, and until the arrival of John VI, the country continued to be a colony with purely extractive objectives. Higher education was discouraged and resources were barely available for the most basic education of the resident population. When the Portuguese court arrived, it found a plundered, uncultivated and poor territory. Obliged by circumstances and uncertain about returning to the metropolis, the king began a process of international openness and more progressive economic development. But this flourishing was short-lived: the king was forced to return to Portugal following the Liberal Revolution and the Portuguese revolutionaries attempted to impose a return to the previous colonialist model, which failed at Brazil's independence.

Artistically, the presence of the court led to some advances, such as the founding of the Royal School of Sciences, Arts and Crafts, predecessor of the Imperial Academy, and the cultural life of Rio de Janeiro at that time suddenly became quite rich. Likewise, the departure of the king emptied the scene as fast as it had populated it. The process of independence also cost the coffers of the new empire dearly. On his departure John VI withdrew a large sum from the Bank of Brazil, causing in effect almost a national bankruptcy, England pocketed two million pounds to recognize Brazil's independence, and the new imperial house had to face serious reduction in its spending on art. And since there was no solid and long-standing tradition of higher-level art education and practice in the country, even the local elites were largely provincial.

The situation improved with the stabilization of the Second Reign, but this did not mean that it became prodigal, far from it, and the environment was characterized more and more by bashfulness. Compared to the opulence of the great European courts, Brazilian palaces were more like the mansions of the petty nobility. Even the crown for the accession of Pedro II had to be made using material from his father's crown. As for the academy's expenses, they did not exceed eight hundred and twenty million réis, including scholarships, salaries, maintenance of the equipment and the building, and pensions, an amount that was equivalent to the imperial family's summer expenses in Petrópolis and half of the expense of the stables. As for the art market of the time, it always remained small, consisting almost exclusively of the emperor and his family members.

The creation of a face for Brazil 

Brazilian Romanticism reached its peak when the movement, in its most extreme form, had already cooled down many years ago in Europe, settling down into an art of the illustrated and wealthy, but conservative and sentimentalist bourgeoisie, which had reneged on a good part of the egalitarian ideals of the French Revolution and the virile impetus of Napoleonic imperialism. It was this third generation Romanticism that was the main source for the development of the Brazilian version in the field of painting, which took place almost exclusively in the circle of the Imperial Academy of Fine Arts in Rio de Janeiro.

Although it was built similarly to the French academy, unlike the latter, the Brazilian one lacked its own consistent tradition and was just barely established, with a precarious functioning structure and lacking resources. Neither society in general was attentive enough to recognize the value of the educational project it presented, nor were the artists ready to take advantage of it as they could if they had received a more complete and effective basic education, with a few notable exceptions. Documents from the period repeatedly deplored the shortage of teachers and equipment, the poor preparation of the students - some were barely literate - and reported a host of other difficulties throughout its history. What this school was able to produce depended in large part on the personal patronage of emperor Pedro II, who had a great interest in the arts and sciences, and who made it the executive arm in the arts of his nationalist project.

Despite the setbacks, it was during the Second Reign that the Imperial Academy entered its most stable and productive phase, closely controlled by the emperor himself, and it was during this phase, with the means sufficiently prepared, that Brazilian Romanticism found conditions to flourish in painting, producing its main names: Victor Meirelles, Pedro Américo, Rodolfo Amoedo and Almeida Júnior, in addition to the precursor work of Manuel de Araújo Porto-Alegre. His work was fundamental for the elaboration of a symbolic imaginary capable of agglutinating the nationalist forces in action at that moment, which sought by all means to obtain an equalization of the Empire of Brazil with the most "civilized" states in Europe and "not to leave to the speculative genius of the foreigner the task of writing our history," as Januário da Cunha Barbosa, secretary of the Brazilian Historic and Geographic Institute, another organization very much engaged in this process, explained.

Within the tight ideological framework and the thematic selectivity that derived from this program, the passion and creative independence of the travelers of the beginning of the century fell into a vacuum, not least because their work did not create a school in Brazil, it was basically directed to European naturalist scientific circles, and apparently their influence did not bear direct fruit, except perhaps in the international dissemination of the natural beauties of the land, which would attract other artists later, in greater numbers and with more to give to the specifically Brazilian artistic development. Instead, a rather classicist dictum prevails, where the portraits of members of the new ruling house and the illustration of events that had marked national history, such as the great battles that defined the territory and guaranteed its sovereignty, the independence process, and the participation of the Indian, are privileged. The most typically romantic aspects of national painting were its clearly nationalistic, didactic and progressive inclination, and a constant idealism, evidenced in the choice of themes and the forms of their expression, with a significant inversion of the predominance of line over stain found in the Davidian pattern that guided neoclassical painting, consistent with the characterization of a new sensibility, different from the neoclassical, more appropriate for the portrait of particularisms and, therefore, of Brazilianness. It is also interesting to point out the differences between pictorial and literary Romanticism in Brazil, the former lacking the Byronian influence that penetrated literature, since the academy was financed by the State, and the emperor's nationalist project was in essence optimistic and completely alien to the ultra-sentimental and morbid side of the second generation of literary Romanticism, the bohemians who suffered from the mal du siècle.

But it is true that the rigid aesthetic principles sustained by the Imperial Academy and its close dependence on government approval did not allow an expression of either the poetic act that defined for the European Romantics the independent and original artistic creation, or of a contesting and revolutionary spirit, another mark of the passionate and even violent Romanticism of the first two international Romantic generations. However, one should not credit only to official impositions the much more restrained and, in the words of some, conventional tone that Brazilian pictorial Romanticism assumed, because, as already mentioned, the great delay in relation to Europe with which it began in Brazil made it assimilate the influence not so much of its first impetus, but of the declining phase of this current, typified by French Pompier art, which is essentially bourgeois, conformist, eclectic and sentimental.

Even though there was a scholarship system with travel to Europe for the most outstanding artists to broaden their horizons, recommendations were made to avoid disturbing influences such as those of a Delacroix, for example, who could raise doubts about the legitimacy of a government that had just been established after long Portuguese dependence, and in this sense, one of the facets of Brazilian Romanticism was its systematic refusal to remember Portugal, with locals seeking education and inspiration in France or, to a lesser extent, in Italy.

However, the elites engaged in this process of building a national identity seemed to be unaware of the problems involved in mirroring foreign models. Lilia Schwarcz states that in its attempt to elaborate its own iconography Brazil fell into a paradox. While on the one hand Dom Pedro II's nationalist project had all the characteristics of sincerity and was the fruit of obvious necessity, his conception of progress and civilization was still strongly grounded in Europe. It is therefore not surprising that the face of Brazil he wished to present to the world sinned by partiality, seeking to portray the landscape according to a formal model that was also European and completely ignoring negative social aspects such as slavery. On this topic, apart from the documental and ethnographic interest of the travelers, the black man, in Brazilian academic painting, with very rare exceptions, will only cease to figure as an anonymous element and mere part of the landscape to take center stage when the abolitionist movement was already gaining an irrepressible force, and after the Republic became more common and acceptable. But by this time, Romanticism also had its days numbered and new aesthetic schools were prevailing.

The indigenous people had better luck. After centuries of persecution and massacres, the State now encouraged their portrayal, completely idealized, it should be said, as the ideal prototype of a pure culture integrated into its environment and as the other ethnic group recognized as forming the new nation. The Indianist movement was born, a great channel of expression for romantic visions, with even more intense manifestations in literature and the graphic arts. No wonder that Dom Pedro II's privileges included a toucan-feathered mace, inspired by the feather art of the Indian chiefs, since in the words of Lilia Schwarcz...

In the images of the time, the indigenism ceased to be only an aesthetic model, to be incorporated into the very representation of royalty: the empire performed, then, an "American mimesis" (Alencastro, 1980:307). Thus, alongside classical allegories appear almost white and idealized natives in a tropical environment, or else cherubs and allegories that sharing space with the natives come to embody a mythical and authentic past.

Finally, the historical scene, the landscape, the portrait of the imperial family, the indigenous and popular types, although they were central themes in Brazilian pictorial Romanticism, do not exhaust it. There was some production of still lifes, genre scenes, religious works, and even some rare cases of mythological allegories, Orientalism, and medievalism, genres that make the national romantic panorama even richer and more interesting. Despite the emergence of other trends from the 1890s on, such as Realism, Naturalism, Impressionism and Symbolism, the academic model enshrined in Romanticism would still be noticeable in national painting at least until the first decades of the 20th century, when the first modernist vanguards began to act. In this final phase, according to Coelho de Sá, there is "a process of deacademization, freeing our Academicism gradually from the traditional teaching methodology, solidly based on the study of the human figure, drawing and Renaissance illusionist color, and also freeing itself from its ideological, technical and formal concepts."

Central names

Araújo Porto-Alegre 

Porto-Alegre was a polymorphous talent; diplomat, art critic, historian, architect, set designer, poet and writer, he left little work in painting, although he was the mentor of the next generation and perhaps the most typical of all the Romantics. His major importance was in organizing the academy, promoting nationalism, defending art as a relevant social force, and encouraging progress in general. The founding of the periodical Nitheroy in 1836 is regarded as one of the initial milestones of Brazilian Romanticism. In a speech at the solemn session of the academy in 1855 he said:

The new classes, that the Imperial Government offers (...) today to the youth in this education reform, will open a new era for the Brazilian industry, and give the youth a secure subsistence. They will give artifice a new light, denied for thirty years by those who live off a part of their sweat; they will subtract another portion of the debt incurred in Ypiranga; because a nation is only independent when it exchanges the products of its intelligence, when it satisfies itself, or when it raises its national conscience, and leaves the tulmuthous arena, where internal and external contradictions are debated, to occupy itself with its material progress as the basis of its moral happiness. In these new classes he will have a fertile spring in all his future, a new view to study nature and admire its infinite variety and beauty. (...) Young people, leave the prejudice of longing for public jobs, the telethon of the offices, which ages you prematurely, and condemns you to poverty and to a continuous slavery; apply yourselves to arts and industry: the arm that was born to be an ass or a trowel should not handle the pen. Banish the prejudices of a decadent race, and the maxims of laziness and corruption: the artist, the artificer and the craftsman are as good workers in the building of the sublime nation as the priest, the magistrate and the soldier: work is strength, strength intelligence, and intelligence power and divinity.

Pedro Américo 

Pedro Américo, whose historical scene The Battle of Avaí, painted in Florence, catapulted him to fame in Europe and made him famous in Brazil even before it was exhibited to the public, generated a heated aesthetic and ideological debate that was fundamental in defining the directions of Brazilian art. He was also a rare case among his peers of intensive parallel cultivation of orientalism and religious painting, genres in which he declared to feel more comfortable, although they do not constitute his most relevant production for the history of national painting. But they are still an interesting document of the sentimentalism common to the later European Romantics, with whom he spent most of his career, far from Brazil.

Victor Meirelles 

Victor Meirelles, Pedro Americo's main competitor, was also the author of historical scenes emblematic of national identity, such as First Massa in Brazil, where he adopts Indianism and fuses his lyrical vein with his classicist and neo-Baroque inclinations, shaping one of Brazil's origin myths. According to Jorge Coli, "Meirelles achieved the rare convergence of forms, intentions, and meanings that make a painting enter powerfully into a culture. This image of the discovery will hardly ever be erased, or replaced. It is the first mass in Brazil. It is the powers of art fabricating history."

Rodolfo Amoedo 

Amoedo produced much on mythological and biblical themes, but in the early 1880s he was especially interested in Indianism, producing at least one play of great significance in this trend, The last Tamoio, where he adds naturalistic elements in a rich and elegiac romantic representation. Later his work would assimilate the influence of Impressionism and touches of Orientalism, without, however, abandoning the dreamy and introspective atmospheres so dear to a certain strain of the Romantics. Gonzaga Duque says that his production reaches its peak with paintings such as Jacob's departure, The narration of Philéctas, and Bad News, where he formulates "an art finely expressive and less materialistic, in which exuded the dominant of his predilections embodied in a worldly refinement of existence or - to put it more succinctly - a certain elegant epicureanism, apprehended in the select coexistence of a cultured environment, of the super-ten, strongly shaken by sentimental crises, of atavistic background."

Almeida Júnior 

Almeida Júnior, the other great name of the period, after a clearly romantic beginning, where he left significant works, evolved quickly to the incorporation of Realism, with great interest in the popular types of the interior. He was the painter par excellence of the taste of the land, of the beauty of the landscape, of the Brazilian light, and this lasting Brazilianism is what most justifies his inclusion among the national romantics.

Other artists 

Other notable Brazilians also worked along romantic lines, at least part of their careers. Among them, Jerônimo José Telles Júnior, Aurélio de Figueiredo, Henrique Bernardelli, Antônio Parreiras, Antônio Firmino Monteiro, João Zeferino da Costa, Belmiro de Almeida, Eliseu Visconti, Arthur Timótheo da Costa, Pedro Weingärtner, and Décio Villares.

It is mandatory to mention the great number of foreign artists who, after those precursors mentioned in the passage about the foundation of national Romanticism, either passing through or settling permanently in Brazil, made a contribution during the heyday of Romantic painting and the operation of the Imperial Academy, engaging in historical painting and disseminating the practice of outdoor landscaping, and also teaching. Among them can be mentioned Henri Nicolas Vinet, Georg Grimm, and Nicola Antonio Facchinetti, landscape painters, Edoardo de Martino and Giovanni Battista Castagneto, and José Maria de Medeiros, Pedro Peres, Louis-Auguste Moreaux, François-René Moreaux, and Augusto Rodrigues Duarte, historical painters. The landscape was a theme of special interest to foreigners, who made a fundamental contribution to the development of this genre, attracted by a nature they considered exotic and picturesque, rich in animals and plants unknown to them.

Legacy 

In the same way that the definition of the characteristics and chronological limits of international Romanticism has not yet reached a consensus in the opinion of outside critics, the analysis of Brazilian painting from the second half of the 19th century is still permeated with subtleties, contradictions and vagueness. Some hesitate to affirm its value and even doubt that this production can truly be called romantic, since it has clear neoclassical and other realistic traits, suffered strong political control and is inextricably linked to the Imperial Academy of Fine Arts, and its history is largely intertwined with it. This essentially depreciative opinion was the one that prevailed among art historians until well into the 20th century, but more recent studies, carried out in a broader and more comprehensive historical perspective, seem to agree that the Romantic style is well characterized and played a role of great importance in its historical moment, although in fact we can only speak of an "academic Romanticism" in Brazil.

Like the academy, the movement suffered attacks since the end of the 19th century by writers of the younger generation, such as Gonzaga Duque and Angelo Agostini, who saw its utopian idealism as anemic, elitist, outdated, servile and overly dependent on Europe, disconnected from modern times and of no relevance to national culture. In criticizing the alleged weaknesses of national Romanticism they were wishing for rapid artistic progress for their homeland, but lacked the temporal distance necessary for impartiality and balance of judgment. By analyzing only the moment and the circumscribed environment in which they lived, they apparently did not take into account the previous determinants that drove Brazilian artistic development in the 19th century. Nor did they correctly estimate the real possibilities of large-scale cultural renewal of a country that was barely consolidating itself as an independent entity and had a long and deep-rooted baroque heritage that even in the final years of the nineteenth century still survived in various regions and in various expressions of popular art and culture, and that were little affected by what was happening in the Empire's capital.

Despite all the criticism that may be raised, and considering that everything had to be done practically from scratch, what was produced in Romantic painting in the second half of the 19th century in Brazil may well be considered a triumph, the triumph of an aesthetic revolution that left perennial marks in the national collective memory and signified the country's entry into modernity. When the Battles of Meirelles and Américo were exhibited at the 1879 Salon their impact on the public was immediate and spectacular, suffice it to say that they were visited over 62 days by 292,286 people, when Rio de Janeiro had just over 300,000 inhabitants, a success whose proportions have not been surpassed even by the modern São Paulo Art Biennials. It was with a Romantic work, The First Mass in Brazil, that Brazil was represented for the first time in the demanding Paris Salon, and with The Battle of Avaí a national author became famous in the Old World for the first time, signifying the first steps, albeit timid, towards an active participation of the country in the international art circuit. These and other capital works of Romanticism, such as Moema, the Last Tamoio, Independence or Death! and The Emperor's speech, are the most memorable visual reconstructions of Brazilian history. Their popular prestige has never declined, they are reproduced in all schoolbooks and reach an audience of millions of new students every year, which attests with little doubt to the merit of their authors, the efficiency of this style, and the farsightedness of the official project by whose strength they were born. The rescue of the Indian operated by the Romantics, plus the empathetic and positive portrayal of other popular types, represented the first movement toward a new national integration, and the nationalism that directed much of the Romantic production laid the foundations of the modern notion of Brazilianness.

Gallery

References

Further reading 

 History of painting
 Brazilian painting
 Romanticism
 Academic art
 Neoclassicism
 Realism

External links 
 A Revista Eletrônica de 19 & 20- Large database of articles about Brazilian art in the 19th and early 20th century
 Pitoresco- Articles and biographies of Brazilian artists
 Freire, Laudelino - Um Século de Pintura (1816-1916)- One of the first and most important reference sources on 19th century Brazilian art

Brazilian painting
Romanticism